The Plateau–Rayleigh instability, often just called the Rayleigh instability, explains why and how a falling stream of fluid breaks up into smaller packets with the same volume but less surface area.  It is related to the Rayleigh–Taylor instability and is part of a greater branch of fluid dynamics concerned with fluid thread breakup.   This fluid instability is exploited in the design of a particular type of ink jet technology whereby a jet of liquid is perturbed into a steady stream of droplets.

The driving force of the Plateau–Rayleigh instability is that liquids, by virtue of their surface tensions, tend to minimize their surface area.  A considerable amount of work has been done recently on the final pinching profile by attacking it with self-similar solutions.

History

The Plateau–Rayleigh instability is named for Joseph Plateau and Lord Rayleigh. Later, Rayleigh showed theoretically that a vertically falling column of non-viscous liquid with a circular cross-section should break up into drops if its length exceeded its circumference, which is indeed  times its diameter.

Theory

The explanation of this instability begins with the existence of tiny perturbations in the stream. These are always present, no matter how smooth the stream is (for example, in the liquid jet nozzle, there is vibration on the liquid stream due to a friction between the nozzle and the liquid stream). If the perturbations are resolved into sinusoidal components, we find that some components grow with time, while others decay with time. Among those that grow with time, some grow at faster rates than others. Whether a component decays or grows, and how fast it grows is entirely a function of its wave number (a measure of how many peaks and troughs per unit length) and the radius of the original cylindrical stream. The diagram to the right shows an exaggeration of a single component.

By assuming that all possible components exist initially in roughly equal (but minuscule) amplitudes, the size of the final drops can be predicted by determining by wave number which component grows the fastest. As time progresses, it is the component with the maximal growth rate that will come to dominate and will eventually be the one that pinches the stream into drops.

Although a thorough understanding of how this happens requires a mathematical development (see references), the diagram can provide a conceptual understanding. Observe the two bands shown girdling the stream—one at a peak and the other at a trough of the wave. At the trough, the radius of the stream is smaller, hence according to the Young–Laplace equation the pressure due to surface tension is increased. Likewise at the peak the radius of the stream is greater and, by the same reasoning, pressure due to surface tension is reduced. If this were the only effect, we would expect that the higher pressure in the trough would squeeze liquid into the lower-pressure region in the peak. In this way we see how the wave grows in amplitude over time.

But the Young-Laplace equation is influenced by two separate radius components. In this case one is the radius, already discussed, of the stream itself. The other is the radius of curvature of the wave itself. The fitted arcs in the diagram show these at a peak and at a trough. Observe that the radius of curvature at the trough is, in fact, negative, meaning that, according to Young–Laplace, it actually decreases the pressure in the trough. Likewise the radius of curvature at the peak is positive and increases the pressure in that region. The effect of these components is opposite the effects of the radius of the stream itself.

The two effects, in general, do not exactly cancel. One of them will have greater magnitude than the other, depending upon wave number and the initial radius of the stream. When the wave number is such that the radius of curvature of the wave dominates that of the radius of the stream, such components will decay over time. When the effect of the radius of the stream dominates that of the curvature of the wave, such components grow exponentially with time.

When all the maths is done, it is found that unstable components (that is, components that grow over time) are only those where the product of the wave number with the initial radius is less than unity. The component that grows the fastest is the one whose wave number satisfies the equation

Examples

Water dripping from a faucet/tap

A special case of this is the formation of small droplets when water is dripping from a faucet/tap.  When a segment of water begins to separate from the faucet, a neck is formed and then stretched. If the diameter of the faucet is big enough, the neck does not get sucked back in, and it undergoes a Plateau–Rayleigh instability and collapses into a small droplet.

Urination

Another everyday example of Plateau–Rayleigh instability occurs in urination, particularly standing male urination. The stream of urine experiences instability after about 15 cm (6 inches), breaking into droplets, which causes significant splash-back on impacting a surface. By contrast, if the stream contacts a surface while still in a stable state – such as by urinating directly against a urinal or wall – splash-back is almost completely eliminated.

Inkjet printing

Continuous ink jet printers (as opposed to drop-on-demand ink jet printers) generate a cylindrical stream of ink that breaks up into droplets prior to staining printer paper. By adjusting the size of the droplets using tunable temperature or pressure perturbations and imparting electrical charge to the ink, inkjet printers then steer the stream of droplets using electrostatics to form specific patterns on printer paper

Notes

External links

Plateau–Rayleigh Instability – a 3D lattice kinetic Monte Carlo simulation
Savart–Plateau–Rayleigh instability of a water column – Adaptive numerical simulation
An MIT lecture on falling fluid jets, including the Plateau -Rayleigh instability Pdf form, quite mathematical.

Fluid dynamics
Fluid dynamic instabilities
Articles containing video clips